Forever Yours may refer to:

Film and television
Forever Yours (1930 film), an unreleased film starring Mary Pickford
Forever Yours (1936 film) or Forget Me Not, a British musical drama
Forever Yours (1945 film), an American drama film
Forever Yours (1959 film), an Egyptian film
Forever Yours (2004 film), a Hong Kong film directed by Clifton Ko
Forever Yours (telenovela) or Eternamente tuya, a 2009 Mexican telenovela

Music

Albums
Forever Yours (Dottie West album) or the title song, 1970
Forever Yours (Luv' album), 1980
Forever Yours (The Sylvers album) or the title song, 1978
Forever Yours (Tony Terry album), or the title song, 1987

Songs
"Forever Yours" (Alex Day song), 2011
"Forever Yours" (Every Little Thing song), 1998
"Forever Yours (Tribute)", by Kygo, with Avicii and Sandro Cavazza, 2020
"Forever Yours", by Carl Perkins, B-side to "That's Right", 1957
"Forever Yours", by Edward W. Hardy from The Woodsman, 2012
"Forever Yours", by Five Star, B-side to "Whenever You're Ready", 1987
"Forever Yours", by Janet Jackson, a B-side to "Come Give Your Love to Me", 1983
"Forever Yours", by Nightwish from Century Child, 2002
"Forever Yours", by the Romantics from National Breakout
"Forever Yours", by Sunrise Avenue from On the Way to Wonderland, 2006

Other
Forever Yours (horse) (born 1933), an American Thoroughbred racehorse
Forever Yours, a variant of the Milky Way chocolate bar
Forever Yours, an imprint of Forever, an imprint of Grand Central Publishing

See also
Eternally Yours (disambiguation)